The Department of Psychological and Behavioural Science is a department in the London School of Economics and Political Science, founded in 1964. Until 2009, it was located within the Department of Sociology since  it is a centre for the study of the human mind and behaviour in a societal context. More specifically, work undertaken at the Department strives to understand the social processes that emerge at the intersection between the individual and wider societal contexts. This is trying to be achived by analysing theoretical development and doing empirical research. The latter is mainly on topics such as social representations, behaviour, health, community, culture, racism, ethnicity, communications and the media, organisational psychology, the social construction of technology, gender, economic psychology, sexuality, social identity, risk and society, or innovation and creativity in organisations and businesses.

The Department has an international reputation for its research-led teaching in a variety of fields including the study of organizations, social representations, health and community, and the media. Its research atmosphere benefits from the legacy of Emeritus Professor Rob Farr and the late Professor Hilde Himmelweit, whose work established the LSE as a centre for the study of societal and sociological forms of social psychology. It has a strong international student component, with more than three-quarters of students coming from outside Britain. Addtionally, it offers an undergraduate programme in Psychological and Behavioural Science (BSc), master's courses in Behavioural Science; Social and Organisational Psychology; Psychology of Economic Life; Social and Cultural Psychology; Social and Public Communication, as well as MPhil and PhD studies; and an Executive MSc programme in Behavioural Science. The Department is also home to a number of Research Groups, such as the Science, Technology and the Public Sphere research group, the Health, Community and Development research group, The Organisational Studies Research Group, the Social Psychological Research into Racism and Multiculture group (SPRRaM), and the LSE Social Representations Group.

External links
Department of Psychological and Behavioural Science
London School of Economics
SPRRaM
Organisation Studies research group 

Social science institutes
Research institutes in London
Research institutes established in 1964
1964 establishments in the United Kingdom